Rajganj Assembly constituency is an assembly constituency in Jalpaiguri district in the Indian state of West Bengal. It is reserved for scheduled castes.

Overview
As per orders of the Delimitation Commission, No. 18 Rajganj Assembly constituency (SC) covers Binnaguri, Kukurjan, Majhiali, Mantadari, Panikauri, Sannyasikata, Sikarpur and Sukhani gram panchayats of  Rajganj community development block, and Baropatia Nutanabos, Belakoba, Paharpur and Patkata gram panchayats of Jalpaiguri community development block.

Rajganj Assembly constituency is part of No. 3 Jalpaiguri (Lok Sabha constituency) (SC).

Members of Legislative Assembly

Election results

2011
In the 2011 elections, Khageshwar Roy of Trinamool Congress defeated his nearest rival Amulya Chandra Roy of CPI(M).

1977-2009
In the 2009 bye-elections, caused by the election of sitting MLA Mahendra Kumar Roy from Jalpaiguri (Lok Sabha constituency), Khageswar Roy of Trinamool Congress won the Rajganj (SC) seat.

In the 2006 state assembly elections, Mahendra Kumar Roy of CPI(M) won the Rajganj (SC) assembly seat defeating his nearest rival Khageswar Roy of Trinamool Congress. Contests in most years were multi cornered but only winners and runners are being mentioned. Jotindra Nath Roy of CPI(M) defeated Khageswar Roy of Trinamool Congress in 2001, and Ajit Kumar Roy of Congress in 1996 and 1991. Dhirendra Nath Roy of CPI(M) defeated Birendra Das of Congress in 1987, Jiban Kumar Ray of Congress in 1982 and Monomohan Roy of Janata Party in 1977.

1967–1972 
Mrigendra Narayan Roy of Congress won in 1972. Bhagwan Singh Roy of Congress won in 1971. Kiran Chandra Roy of Congress won in 1969. B.N.R.Hakim of SSP won in 1967.

References

Assembly constituencies of West Bengal
Politics of Jalpaiguri district